Woolly Tops Mountain is a mountain in the Great Smoky Mountains in Sevier County, Tennessee.

Description

Although not served by an official trail, the mountain can be accessed via the Appalachian Trail from Laurel Top via a ridge between the two mountains. It rises approximately  along its northern base from the Middle Prong of the Little Pigeon River, also known as Greenbrier Creek.

On August 12, 1944, a Beechcraft Model 17 Staggerwing from Oak Ridge, Tennessee, crashed into Woolly Tops Mountain. The wreckage was not discovered until January 19, 1947, by a group of hikers from the Smoky Mountain Hiking Club. The remains of the three occupants were reportedly never found.

References

Mountains of Tennessee
Mountains of Great Smoky Mountains National Park
Protected areas of Sevier County, Tennessee
Mountains of Sevier County, Tennessee